(Cain and Abel) is a 2016 Japanese television drama, starring Ryosuke Yamada, Kiritani Kenta, Kurashina Kana and Takashima Masanobu. It airs on every Mondays at 21:00 (JST) on Fuji Television beginning October 17, 2016. This is also Ryosuke Yamada's first lead role in the Fuji TV 21:00 drama time slot.

Cast 
 Ryosuke Yamada as Takada Yu
 Kiritani Kenta as Takada Ryuichi
 Kurashina Kana as Yahagi Azusa
 Takashima Masanobu as Takada Takayuki
 Takenaka Naoto as Kurosawa Kosuke
 Otsuka Nene as Hirose Saki
 Minami Kaho as Takada Momoko
 Hira Mikijiro -> Terao Akira as Takada Soichiro
 Kinoshita Houka as Dan Mamoru
 Hino Yojin as Sasaki Hajime
 Yamazaki Hirona as Shibata Hikari
 Nishimura Motoki as Ando Mitsuru
 Tozuka Junki as Mizawa Yota

Episodes

Remark 
 Hira Mikijiro died suddenly on October 22, 2016, and his role as Takada Soichiro was taken over by Terao Akira from Episode 4.
The opening theme song was composed by Dmitri Shostakovich - finale from his Symphony No. 5 (Shostakovich). However, credits to the composer were not given throughout the drama series.

References

External links
  
 Official twitter 

2016 in Japanese television
2016 Japanese television series debuts
2016 Japanese television series endings
Fuji TV dramas
Japanese drama television series